Ecuador has a variety of bus services.

The general types of service include:

 luxury buses — autobús de lujo, which travel the main routes between cities.
 standard buses — these travel more local routes and will stop for any passengers that hails them.
 minibuses — busetas which service the outer fringes of the bus networks
 rancheras — trucks which have been converted to buses by adding wooden benches.  These service the poorer, rural areas, along with camionetas, which are converted pickup trucks.

In the capital, Quito, boarding platforms are used to put passengers at the same level as the entrance to the bus.

See also
Chiva Buses
Share taxi
 Trolleybuses in Quito

References

 
Public transport in Ecuador
Transport in Ecuador